"You" is the fifth single from Japanese pop singer Kaela Kimura. It was released as the third single from her album, Circle, on January 18, 2006. It peaked at number seven on the Japan Oricon singles chart.

Track listing
You (Nestle: "KIT KAT"CMｿﾝｸﾞ)
Pioneer
You (instrumental)
Pioneer (instrumental)

References

2006 singles
Kaela Kimura songs
Japanese-language songs
2006 songs